Djems Kouamé (born April 5, 1989, in Montreal, Quebec) is a former professional Canadian football wide receiver and defensive back in the Canadian Football League who is currently a free agent. He was drafted 18th overall by the Toronto Argonauts in the 2011 CFL Draft and signed with the team on May 31, 2011. He played college football for the Montreal Carabins. On June 17, 2013, Kouamé was released by the Argonauts.

References

External links
CFL profile
 

1989 births
Black Canadian players of Canadian football
Canadian football wide receivers
Canadian people of Ivorian descent
Living people
Montreal Carabins football players
Players of Canadian football from Quebec
Canadian football people from Montreal
Toronto Argonauts players